Kim Seong-min is a North Korean democracy activist and is the director of Free North Korea Radio.

Life in North Korea
Kim Seong-min was born in Chagang, North Korea but was raised in Pyongyang and is the son of a poet. He attended Kim Hyung-jik College of Education until being commissioned as a propaganda writer with the 620th Training Camp Art Propaganda Unit.

Defection to South Korea
Kim Seong-min's uncle lived abroad, and when one of his letters to his uncle was intercepted by North Korean authorities, Kim was accused of espionage. He was sentenced to death in 1997. He jumped from a moving train to avoid execution and then escaped over the North Korean border. He arrived in South Korea in 1999.

Free North Korea Radio
In 2004, Kim helped found Free North Korea Radio with Suzanne Scholte. Free North Korea Radio has since been awarded by Reporters Without Borders their "Prize for Press Freedom" and the "Asia Democracy and Human Rights Award” from the Taiwan Foundation for Democracy. 

Kim was motivated to begin broadcasting news and information into North Korea in part after listening to KBS programming, which used honorifics to refer to Kim Jong-il. He said, "This was not the way radio stations should be referring to Kim Jong-il if they were trying to subvert the listeners." At the same time, South Korea stopped broadcasting into North Korea. Kim said, "We realized it could be, and should be, up to us North Korean defectors to start broadcasts into North Korea."

Among its programs, Free North Korea Radio broadcasts local North Korean news supplied by a series of freelance journalists inside North Korea. In 2007, its secret reporters in North Korea were all arrested. Their whereabouts are currently unknown, and Kim told the Independent that their arrests "devastated" him. "The stress of knowing that could happen again is very hard to bear."

In 2006, Kim met George W. Bush and was honored by the Bush administration. His interview is a permanent feature of the George W. Bush Institute Freedom Collection.

Security threats

Kim Seong-min lives with 24-hour police protection due to being one of the highest priority targets for assassination by the North Korean government, along with Park Sang-hak.

References

External links
Freedom Collection » Interviews » Kim Seong Min Freedom Collection interview
You are being redirected... Free North Korea Radio English-language website
Radio gives hope to North and South Koreans - CNN.com CNN Radio gives hope to North and South Koreans

North Korean human rights activists
North Korean defectors
Living people
Democracy activists
20th-century North Korean people
21st-century South Korean people
Year of birth missing (living people)
People from Chagang